Novaro is a surname, and may refer to:

 Marco Novaro (1912–?), Italian sailor 
 Maria Novaro (born 1951), Mexican film director
 Michele Novaro (1818–1885), Italian songwriter
 Octavio Novaro (1939–2018), Mexican theoretical physicist
 Tito Novaro (1918–1986), Mexican actor, director and screenwriter

See also
 Novarro
 Navarro